Oxystele tigrina, common name the tiger top shell, is a species of sea snail, a marine gastropod mollusk in the family Trochidae, the top snails.

Description
The size of an adult shell varies between 25 mm and 43 mm. The more or less elevated, imperforate shell has a conoidal shape. It is lusterless blackish or purplish, unicolored or with a few scattered white dots, or yellowish flexiious lines. The yellow or whitish, apical whorls are eroded. The about 6 whorls are spirally coarsely but obsoletely lirate. The large aperture lis oblique with a black border and is silvery within. The simple columella is white or yellowish, bordered by a dull purplish streak. The parietal wall is usually covered by a thin silvery callus.

Distribution
This marine species occurs along Namibia and the south coast of South Africa.

References

 Kilburn, R.N. (1977) Taxonomic studies on the marine Mollusca of southern Africa and Mozambique. Part 1. Annals of the Natal Museum, 23, 173–214
 Steyn, D.G. & Lussi, M. (1998) Marine Shells of South Africa. An Illustrated Collector’s Guide to Beached Shells. Ekogilde Publishers, Hartebeespoort, South Africa, ii + 264 pp. page(s): 24
 Branch, G.M. et al. (2002). Two Oceans. 5th impression. David Philip, Cate Town & Johannesburg.
 Donald K.M., Kennedy M. & Spencer H.G. (2005) The phylogeny and taxonomy of austral monodontine topshells (Mollusca: Gastropoda: Trochidae), inferred from DNA sequences. Molecular Phylogenetics and Evolution 37: 474–483

External links
 

tigrina
Gastropods described in 1839